William Douglas, 1st Earl of Queensberry (c. 15828 March 1639/40) was a Scottish noble.

He was the eldest son of James Douglas, 8th of Drumlanrig and his wife Mary Fleming. He inherited his father's title, as 9th Laird of Drumlanrig, in October 1615. Between 1616 and 1623, he held the offices of Provost of Lincluden, Sheriff of Dumfries, and Justice of the peace for Dumfries.
On 1 April 1628 he was created lord Douglas, of Hawick and Tibbers, viscount Drumlanrig.

He was created the first earl of Queensberry in 1633, originating the still-extant Queensberry titles. On his death he was succeeded in his titles by his son James.

Family
He married Isabel Kerr, daughter of Mark, Earl of Lothian in 1603. They had issue:
 James (before 16221671), who became second earl
 William (died 1673), ancestor of subsequent marquesses of Queensberry
 Archibald (born after 1604)
 Robert
 Margaret (died 1640), married James Johnstone, 1st Earl of Hartfell in 1622
 Janet, married Thomas Maclellan, 2nd Lord Kirkcudbright 28 July 1640

References

|-

1580s births
17th-century deaths
Year of birth uncertain
William Douglas 01
William
Scottish sheriffs
Scottish justices of the peace
Peers of Scotland created by Charles I
Members of the Convention of the Estates of Scotland 1630